The Honda VF400F (NC13) is a naked or standard motorcycle with a  four-stroke V4 engine produced by Honda in 1982 and 1983. It had inboard ventilated disc brakes, Honda's torque reactive anti dive control (TRAC) system and air-assisted front and rear suspension.

See also
 Honda VF and VFR
 List of Honda motorcycles

References

VF400F
Motorcycles introduced in 1982
Standard motorcycles
Motorcycles powered by V engines